The Wisconsin Wing of the Civil Air Patrol (CAP) is the highest echelon of Civil Air Patrol in the state of Wisconsin. Wisconsin Wing headquarters are located in Madison, Wisconsin. The Wisconsin Wing consists of over 1000 cadet and adult members at multiple locations across the state of Wisconsin.

Mission
The Wisconsin Wing performs the three missions of the Civil Air Patrol: providing emergency services; offering cadet programs for youth; and providing aerospace education for both CAP members and the general public.

Emergency services
The Civil Air Patrol performs emergency services missions, including search and rescue (SAR) missions directed by the Air Force Rescue Coordination Center. Aircrews can perform visual and electronic searches, while ground teams home in on the search target with direction finding equipment. After a disaster, Civil Air Patrol personnel provide humanitarian support, including air/ground transportation, as well as an extensive communications network.

Cadet programs
The Civil Air Patrol offers cadet programs for youth aged 12 to 21. Cadets participate in CAP activities, practice leadership skills, and learn academic material. The curriculum of the cadet program is composed of physical fitness, leadership development, character development and aerospace education. Cadets may earn promotions and more advanced leadership positions as they progress through the program.

Aerospace education
The Civil Air Patrol offers aerospace education to both its own members and the general public.

The Civil Air Patrol provides aerospace education for CAP cadets and senior members by providing trips to conventions, airports, military bases, and other related places of aerospace interest.

To educate the public, the CAP informs the general public about aviation and space activities and supports thousands of aerospace education workshops for teachers at colleges and universities around the country. The Civil Air Patrol also maintains working relationships with local education agencies and several national organizations such as the FAA, NASA and the Air Force Association to facilitate aerospace education in schools.

Organization

The Wisconsin Wing is divided into six groups across the state, with each squadron being assigned as a component of a group based on its geographical location.

Legal protection
Employers within the borders of Wisconsin are required by law to give their employees who are members of the Civil Air Patrol up to fifteen days annually (though no more than five consecutive days at a time) of unpaid leave if those employees are called to respond to an emergency as a part of the Civil Air Patrol. Employers are forbidden from discriminating against a potential employee due to his or her membership in the Civil Air Patrol.

See also
Awards and decorations of the Civil Air Patrol
Wisconsin Air National Guard
Wisconsin State Defense Force

References

External links
Wisconsin Wing Civil Air Patrol official website

Wings of the Civil Air Patrol
Education in Wisconsin
Military in Wisconsin